Harvey Dunn (6 September 1931 – 7 June 2013) was an Australian rules footballer who played with Carlton in the Victorian Football League (VFL). Dunn was the first player ever recruited under the father–son rule, as his father, Harvey Dunn Sr., had played for Carlton.

Notes

External links 

Harvey Dunn's profile at Blueseum

1931 births
Carlton Football Club players
2013 deaths
Australian rules footballers from Victoria (Australia)
Box Hill Football Club players